Crypsotidia maculifera is a species of moth in the family Erebidae first described by Otto Staudinger in 1898. The species is found in Burkina Faso, Cape Verde, Egypt, Ethiopia, Ghana, Kenya, Malawi, Mauritania, Niger, Nigeria, Senegal, Sudan, Cyprus and Israel.

There is one generation per year depending on the location. Adults are on wing from March to August depending on the location.

References

External links

Image

Crypsotidia
Moths described in 1898
Moths of Cape Verde
Moths of the Middle East
Moths of Africa